Rev. Peter Hempson Ditchfield, FSA (1854–1930) was a Church of England priest, an historian and a prolific author. He is notable for having co-edited three Berkshire volumes of the Victoria County History which were published between 1907 and 1924.

Life
Ditchfield was born in Westhoughton, Lancashire in 1854. He was schooled at the Clitheroe Royal Grammar School and studied at Oriel College, Oxford. He was ordained deacon in 1878 and priest in 1879. Ditchfield served his title as curate of St Michael's parish church, Sandhurst until 1880, followed by a second curacy at Christ Church, Reading, Berkshire.

Ditchfield was appointed Rector of Barkham in 1886: a post that he held until his death. From 1886 until 1903 Ditchfield was Inspector of Schools for the Diocese of Oxford.

In 1898 Ditchfield married the daughter of Charles Smith of Ravenswood, Berkshire.

Ditchfield was an historian and a prolific author. He also co-edited with W.H. Page three Berkshire volumes of the Victoria County History, which were published in 1907, 1923 and 1924.

Ditchfield was Secretary of the Berkshire Archaeological Society for 38 years until 1929, when he became its president. He edited the Berks, Bucks and Oxon Archaeological Journal from 1897 until his death.

Ditchfield was a Freemason. He was Grand Chaplain of the Freemasons of England in 1917 and of the Mark Masons in 1918.

References

Selected works

External links
 
 
 
 Berkshire Archaeological Society

1854 births
1930 deaths
Alumni of Oriel College, Oxford
19th-century English Anglican priests
20th-century English Anglican priests
English local historians
19th-century English historians
British medievalists
Historians of the British Isles
People from Westhoughton
English male non-fiction writers
Contributors to the Victoria County History
People educated at Clitheroe Royal Grammar School
20th-century English historians